Donovan Morgan (born July 29, 1982) is an arena football wide receiver who is currently a free agent.

After playing college football for the University of Louisiana at Lafayette, Morgan was signed as an undrafted free agent by the New York Jets, spending time in their training camp. He played two stints with the Tulsa Talons of the af2. While a member of the Talons in 2005, Morgan set af2 records for touchdown receptions (54), total touchdowns (57) and points scored in a season (346). He was signed by the Buffalo Bills on May 21, 2007, but released on August 27, 2007.

Early life
Morgan attended Sarah T. Reed High School in New Orleans, Louisiana.

Professional career

NFL
Morgan spent 2004 to 2006 in the National Football League with the New York Jets, Houston Texans and Kansas City Chiefs. In 2005 with the Texans, Morgan played in three games, catching four passes for 42 yards.

af2
Morgan had two stints with the Tulsa Talons. In 2005, he played for Tulsa in the af2. He set af2 records with 346 points, 57 total touchdowns, and 54 receiving touchdowns. He was named the af2 Rookie of the Year.

Buffalo Bills
In 2007, Morgan signed with the Buffalo Bills and spent time with the team during training camp.

Arena Football League
In 2008, Morgan signed with the Chicago Rush, catching 111 passes for 1,281 yards and 24 touchdowns. He was named the AFL Rookie of the Year, becoming the first player to win Rookie of the Year honors twice, in the af2 and AFL. For the Rush, Morgan formed a three-headed receiver trio with Damian Harrell and Travis LaTendresse, and all three racked up 1,000 receiving yards in the season.

CIFL
When the AFL didn't play in 2009, Morgan joined the Chicago Slaughter of the Continental Indoor Football League. There, he Russ Michna and other former member of the Chicago Rush lead the Slaughter to a 2009 CIFL Championship Game victory. Morgan was named MVP of the championship game.

Return to the AFL
In 2010, Morgan rejoined the Tulsa Talons, and finished the year with 123 receptions and 1,707 yards. His 52 touchdowns led the Arena Football League.

For 2011, Morgan joined the Philadelphia Soul, rejoining quarterback Justin Allgood from Tulsa, and Chicago Rush teammate DeJuan Alfonzo and former Rush coach Mike Hohensee.

In 2012, he was traded to the New Orleans VooDoo at his request to be closer to his family.

On February 13, 2014, he was traded to the Los Angeles KISS for Chase Deadder.

On October 28, 2014, he was assigned to the Las Vegas Outlaws.

On March 10, 2015, Morgan and Lacoltan Bester were traded to the KISS for Derrick Ross.

He retired after the 2016 season.

On March 5, 2019, Morgan came out of retirement and was assigned to the Columbus Destroyers.

See also
 List of Arena Football League and National Football League players

References

External links
Chicago Rush bio 
NFL.com player page

1982 births
Living people
Players of American football from New Orleans
Players of Canadian football from New Orleans
American football wide receivers
Canadian football wide receivers
American players of Canadian football
Louisiana Ragin' Cajuns football players
Tulsa Talons players
New York Jets players
Houston Texans players
Kansas City Chiefs players
Chicago Rush players
Chicago Slaughter players
Calgary Stampeders players
Philadelphia Soul players
New Orleans VooDoo players
Los Angeles Kiss players
Las Vegas Outlaws (arena football) players
Columbus Destroyers players
Pearl River Wildcats football players